Deep Medi Musik is a British dubstep label founded in 2006 by artist Mala.

The label describes the common theme between releases as “music that you can feel”. As a tradition, every time an artist new to the label gets signed, their first release on it has a portrait of the artist drawn by Tunnidge, who has also released multiple EPs with the label.

Notable artists

 Benny Ill
 Digital Mystikz (Coki and Mala)
 Compa
 Goth-Trad
 Kahn
 Kromestar
 Loefah
 Mala
 Mark Pritchard
 Pinch
 Silkie
 Skream
 Truth

References

External links
 Official website
 

Record labels based in London
Electronic music record labels
Record labels established in 2006
Dubstep record labels